The Limey Way is a  challenge walk through Derbyshire, England. It starts at Castleton and progresses through 15 major and 5 minor limestone dales to reach the River Dove and Dovedale, the walk's end.

The walk was first walked by John Merrill and was devised, created and inaugurated by him in May 1969. He wrote a copyright guide to the walk, which has been updated and enlarged over the years. More than 75,000 people have walked the route in either under 24 hours - Red Badge or under 48 hours - Green badge.

References

The Limey Way published by The John Merrill Foundation 1989. The original guidebook in December 1969.

See The Limey Way page on www.johnmerrillwalkguides.co.uk

Footpaths in Derbyshire
Footpaths in Staffordshire
Long-distance footpaths in England
Peak District
Challenge walks